John Forrest (November 25, 1842 – June 23, 1920) was a Presbyterian minister and educator in Nova Scotia, Canada. He was president of Dalhousie University from 1885 to 1910.

He was born in New Glasgow, Nova Scotia, the son of physician Alexander Forrest, an immigrant from Scotland, and Barbara Ross McKenzie, and was educated at the Free Church College in Halifax, and graduated from the Presbyterian College at Truro in 1865, then received the Doctor of Divinity degree from Queen's University, Kingston, in 1873. He was ordained in 1866 and became the pastor for St. John's Church in Halifax. Forrest married Annie Prescott Duff in 1871. In 1878, he became the representative for the Presbyterian Church on the board of governors for Dalhousie University. Forrest resigned as pastor in 1881 to become professor of history at Dalhousie. During his term as president, the law school was formed, the Halifax Medical College and the Maritime Dental College were affiliated with the university and a faculty of engineering was established. He also served as Moderator for the Presbyterian Church in Canada and president of the Nova Scotia Historical Society. Forrest died in Halifax at the age of 77.

His sister Catherine married George Munro, an important patron of Dalhousie University. His sister Isabella was also a philanthropist. He had five children: one son William served as a member of the provincial assembly.

The Forrest Building on the Dalhousie campus was named in his honour.

References 

 Marble, AE Nova Scotians at home and abroad: biographical sketches of over six hundred native born Nova Scotians (1977)  p. 163
Portrait - Forrest

1842 births
1920 deaths
Canadian Presbyterian ministers
Academic staff of the Dalhousie University
People from New Glasgow, Nova Scotia
Canadian university and college chief executives
19th-century Canadian historians